Emre Gökay (born 18 February 2006) is a Turkish professional footballer who plays as a winger for the Süper Lig Sivasspor.

Club career
Gökay is a youth product of Erkiletspor and Sivasspor. On 1 June 2022, he signed his first professional contract with Sivasspor. He made his senior and professional debut with Sivasspor as a late substitute in a 4–1 UEFA Europa Conference League loss to Fiorentina on 16 March 2023.

International career
Gökay is a youth international for Turkey, having played up to the Turkey U17s.

References

External links
 
 

2006 births
Living people
People from Kocasinan
Turkish footballers
Turkey youth international footballers
Association football wingers
Sivasspor footballers